Captain John Hart CMG (25 February 1809 – 28 January 1873) was a South Australian politician and a Premier of South Australia.

Early life
The son of journalist/newspaper publisher John Harriott Hart and Mary Hart née Glanville, John was born on 25 February 1809 probably at 23 Warwick Lane off Newgate Street, London, and baptised at Christ Church Greyfriars, London. At 12 years of age he first went to sea, visiting Hobart, Van Diemen's Land (now Tasmania, Australia) in September 1828 in the Magnet. In 1832 Hart was in command of the schooner Elizabeth, a sealer operating from Tasmania and visiting Kangaroo Island and Gulf St Vincent. In 1833 he took Edward Henty to and from Portland Bay. In 1836 he was sent to London to purchase another vessel, and returning in the Isabella took the first livestock from Tasmania to South Australia in 1837. On the return voyage the Isabella was wrecked off Cape Nelson and Hart lost everything he had. Early January 1838 he was "on the River Murray near Mount Hope" (perhaps the Lachlan near Hillston) and foresaw the great thoroughfare it would become in the second half of that century. He went to Adelaide and John B. Hack sent him to Sydney to buy a vessel in which he brought stock to Portland Bay. Some of this stock he successfully brought overland to South Australia. Hack also gave Hart two acres (0.8 ha) of land in Adelaide. In 1839 he managed a whaling station at Encounter Bay.

In January 1843 Hart sailed to England in command of the South Australian Company's ageing barque Sarah and Elizabeth, delivering it to London for sale. Aboard as a passenger was the explorer John Hill, from whom Hart had just purchased Section 2112 at Port Adelaide, in partnership with Jacob Hagen. In December 1843 Hart returned to Adelaide in command of the barque Augustus of which he was part owner with Jacob Hagen and Hagen's brother. Among the passengers was the artist George French Angas.

After another voyage to England he gave up the sea in 1846, and settled near Port Adelaide, where he joined with H. Kent Hughes as merchants Hughes and Hart then, as Hart & Company, established large and successful flour mills. His flour mill at the Port was regarded as one of the best, and "Hart's Flour" commanded the highest prices in Australia. John Hart & Co. merged with the Adelaide Milling Company in 1882.

He was a member of the Agricultural and Horticultural Society and its president from 1858 to 1859.

He became interested in copper mining, and some imputations having been made of underhand dealings in connection with leases, challenged inquiry. A select committee completely exonerated Hart stating that his conduct in every particular had been that of a strictly honourable and upright man.

Political career
Hart took an interest in public affairs, in 1851 was elected to the Legislative Council. Hart resigned in 1853 to visit England and was re-elected the next year, serving until the Council expired in 1857.

In 1857 Hart became a member for Port Adelaide in the first House of Assembly. He was Treasurer of South Australia in the Baker ministry which lasted only a few days in August 1857, and held the same position in the Hanson cabinet from 30 September 1857 to 12 June 1858 when he resigned. Hart was chief secretary in the short-lived first Dutton ministry in July 1863, and was Treasurer in the first and second Ayers ministries, and the first Blyth ministry from July 1863 to March 1865. Hart became premier and chief secretary from 23 October 1865 to 28 March 1866 at which date he also resigned from parliament.

Hart was member for Light from May 1868 to April 1870. including a second short stint as premier from 24 September 1868 to 13 October 1868.

At the 1870 election, Hart changed seats to represent The Burra, the seat he retained until his death. He was premier and Treasurer again from 30 May 1870 to 10 November 1871.

One newspaper obituary gave the opinion that Hart had been unfairly criticised in several of his decisions (and had been subsequently vindicated) and should have been given credit for the Overland Telegraph Line rather than Sir Henry Ayers.

Death
John Hart died suddenly on 28 January 1873, while chairing the third annual general meeting of the Mercantile Marine Insurance Company at the Adelaide Town Hall, leaving a widow and a large family.

Recognition
Hart was created C.M.G. in 1870.

Family
John Hart married Margaret Gillmor Todd ( Abt. 1815 – 1876) fourth daughter of Charles Hawkes Todd and Elizabeth Bentley (and sister of James Henthorn Todd, Robert Bentley Todd, William Gowan Todd, and Armstrong Todd) on 12 May 1845; among their two sons and five daughters were:
Elizabeth Sarah Hart (9 March 1846 – 3 June 1908) married Henry Brook Dobbin (ca.1840 – 22 July 1873) on 3 July 1867
Margaret Hart (14 May 1847 – 2 August 1920) married Arthur Powell; she founded St. Margaret's Home for convalescents, Semaphore.
John Hart, Jr. (16 July 1848 – 15 August 1881) married Emily Lavinia Finch (1849 – 5 October 1939) on 8 August 1877; he was MHA for Port Adelaide 1880–1881. He died at Wooton Lea, Glen Osmond
Mary Hart (9 September 1849 – 16 April 1915) married Henry Huth Walters (March 1841 – ) on 14 October 1868
Charles Hawkes Todd Hart (19 November 1850 – ) was manager Port Adelaide flour mill 1873, may have returned to England.
Annie Hart (12 August 1852 – 1 December 1913) married Rowland James Egerton-Warburton (4 February 1846 – 1918) on 14 May 1872. Rowland was a son of Colonel Peter Egerton-Warburton.
Katherine Hart (ca.1856 – 21 April 1904) married  Algernon Arbuthnott Godwin on 9 January 1879

See also
Other South Australian flour millers of the period were:
Dr. Benjamin Archer Kent, for whom Kent Town, the site of his mill, was named.
John Darling and Son
John Dunn
James Magarey and his son William James Magarey
William Randell
John Ridley

References

Sources
Sally O'Neill, 'Hart, John (1809–1873)', Australian Dictionary of Biography, Volume 4, Melbourne University Press, 1972, pp 355–356. Retrieved 22 January 2009

 

|-

|-

|-

|-

|-

|-

|-

|-

|-

|-

|-

|-

|-

|-

1809 births
1873 deaths
Premiers of South Australia
Settlers of South Australia
Australian Companions of the Order of St Michael and St George
Members of the South Australian Legislative Council
Members of the South Australian House of Assembly
Treasurers of South Australia
People from the City of London
English emigrants to colonial Australia
Australian flour millers and merchants
19th-century Australian politicians
Australian people in whaling
Australian ship owners
Sealers
19th-century Australian businesspeople